Eliška Krásnohorská (18 November 1847, in Prague – 26 November 1926, in Prague) was a Czech feminist author. She was introduced to literature and feminism by Karolína Světlá. She wrote works of lyric poetry and literary criticism, however, she is usually associated with children's literature and translations, including works by Pushkin, Mickiewicz and Byron.

Krásnohorská wrote the libretti for four operas by Bedřich Smetana: The Kiss, The Secret, The Devil's Wall and Viola. She also wrote the libretto for Zdeněk Fibich's opera Blaník. In 1873, she founded the women's magazine , which she headed until handing it over to Jindřiška Flajšhansová in 1912.

In 1890 Krásnohorská founded the Minerva School in Prague, the first gymnasium for girls in the Austro-Hungarian Empire. Its language of instruction was Czech.

References

1847 births
1926 deaths
Writers from Prague
People from the Kingdom of Bohemia
Czech feminists
Czech women novelists
19th-century Czech poets
Czech translators
Czech opera librettists
19th-century Czech novelists
19th-century women writers
Women opera librettists
Czech women poets
19th-century translators
Czech educators
School founders